The Scottish Gas Board was a state-owned utility providing gas for light and heat to industries and homes in Scotland. The Board was established on 1 May 1949, and dissolved in 1973 when it became a region of the British Gas Corporation.

Problems arising from nationalising part of the British gas industry
The first chairman of the board was Sir Andrew Clow who established the headquarters at 25 Drumsheugh Gardens and 12 Rothesay Terrace Edinburgh. He served until 30 April 1956. In the last of his quarterly letters to his senior management, he reflected on the experience of centralising the control of over two hundred independent undertakings. The remainder of the article is abstracted from that letter and includes explanatory remarks.

Functions of gas undertakings
Each undertaking performed the functions of coal gas production and distribution through underground pipes to domestic, commercial and industrial customers, sales promotion, finance, etc. Some works were too small to remain viable and one at Wigton was closed. Studies were conducted to establish whether previously rival works could be integrated, both managerially and physically by linking their distribution systems.

Ownership of Scottish gas undertakings
Most of the larger gas undertakings had been owned by local authorities and employed many expert and talented engineers. However the same authorities were also owners of electricity generating and supply companies (the main rivals of the gas industry); the local authorities had felt no need to promote competition.

Post-war issues
Immediately after World War II there was a chronic shortage of pipes (for mains replacement and extension to new customers), and other materials. Most gas pipes were made of cast iron and often leaked at the joints. Actual 'unaccounted for gas' (loss through leakage and other losses) was estimated as being as much as 25%. Refurbishment and replacement of pipes was a priority, for safety reasons. Little preventive work was carried out; distribution engineering was usually initiated by the detection of a leak.

Many gas works had not been adequately maintained, the price of coal and of coke oven gas was rising, contractors were in short supply and the Scottish rating system at that time was such that 'profits might prove as damaging as losses'.

Cost-based pricing
Regarding gas tariffs, the chairman wrote "we must keep the allocation of charges between customers fairly close to our estimate of their individual costs and we do not have the freedom of private companies to discriminate between customers whose conditions are similar." This was a reference to the notion that pricing of state-owned produce should reflect cost as accurately as possible (a cost-plus pricing model). This was in very sharp contrast to the free-market concept of charging 'what the market will bear' i.e. the highest price that still enables sufficient competitive advantage to retain that customer, thus capturing all the consumer surplus.

Losing market share
Gas was losing share of the industrial market in Scotland because of falling oil prices. One of the largest refinery sites in the country was located almost at the centre of the industrial belt.

Domestic customers were becoming ever more sensitive to the price of gas as electric heating, in various forms, became relatively cheaper.

New house building after the war was on an unprecedented scale on mainly green-field sites beyond the reach of gas mains. Government rules about return on investment often made mains extension impossible, again to the detriment of suppliers of gas versus electricity.

Personnel problems
While the chairman was confident about the technical expertise of the staff he had inherited, he recognised that, unlike the previous owners, it was necessary to promote gas sales by 'educational advertisement and display, canvassing and salesmanship' and by making 'more contact with domestic customers, local authorities and various personalities'. The industry had, hitherto, been managed mainly by professional engineers, whose aim was to produce and distribute gas as cheaply as possible, bearing in mind that, in the interest of safety, demand had to be met at all times.

Managerial priorities
A failure to supply for any reason had dire consequences. Not only might it entail prosecution for breach of statutory responsibilities, but restoration of supply required, and still requires, every home to be visited to ensure that all gas taps are turned off (including the main supply to the premises). The procedure then requires pipes to be purged to ensure that any explosive mixture of gas and air is removed before the main is pressurised again. Finally, every household had to be visited again to ensure safe restoration of supply.

Consequently, the engineer manager was more concerned about ensuring continuity of supply and with balancing supply with demand on an hourly basis. The notion that in addition to performing his delicate task, he would have to 'sell' gas by making personal contact with potential customers was unusual.

The chairman admitted that "the great amount of work that re-organisation has involved has also had some effect, especially in the bigger places, in leaving Managers too little time to move around and to have frequent and close contact with others at work, whether they are stokers or typists, or mainlayers or meter readers in whatever capacity they serve". Customer contact not mentioned.

Industrial relations
The chairman remarked on the good relations the Board had with the trade unions and, although he welcomed increasing wages, he deplored the fact that wage negotiations were conducted at national level (by the Gas Council) and that wage awards were "above what the cost of living and our (Scottish) position justified."  He regretted that he had to mark his departure with a concomitant rise in gas prices.

Last thoughts
The chairman concluded his account by remarking that "... a first class plant, first class gas and coke, a first class office and showroom, a first class financial system are all admirable. But these and many more gadgets in the machine will be of little value unless those using them add to their professional competence a sense of vocation and an anxiety to brighten up what Wordsworth calls 'the still, sad music of humanity.'"

Undertakings in Scotland vested at nationalisation
The Board took over the following local authority and privately owned gas production and supply utilities:

 Aberdeen Corporation (County of the City of Aberdeen)
 Aberlady and Gullane Gas Company
 Airdrie Burgh Corporation
 Alloa Burgh Corporation
 Alyth Gas Light Company
 Arbroath Burgh Corporation
 Ardrossan Burgh Corporation
 Auchinleck Gas Light Company
 Auchterarder Gas Light Company
 Auchtermuchty Gas Company
 Ayr Gas Company
 Ayton Gas Company
 Banchory Gas Light Company
 Banff and Macduff District Gas Company
 Barrhead Gas Company
 Beith Gas Light Company
 Blairgowrie Gas Light Company
 Bo'ness Gas Light Company
 Bridge of Weir Gas Company
 Broxburn Gas Company
 Buckhaven and Leven Gas Commissioners
 Burntisland Burgh Corporation
 Busby and District Gas Company
 Callander Gas Company
 Campbeltown Burgh Corporation
 Cardenden Gas Company
 Carnoustie Burgh Corporation
 Castle-Douglas Gas Company
 Catrine Gas Company
 Coatbridge Burgh Gas Company
 Coldstream Gas Company
 Coltness Iron Company
 Coupar Angus Gas Company
 Cove and Kilcreggan Burgh Corporation
 Cowdenbeath Gas Company
 Crieff Gas-Light Company
 Cullen District Gas Company
 Cumnock Gas Company
 Cupar Gas Company
 Dalbeattie Gas Light Company
 Dalkeith Gas Light Company
 Dalry Gas Light Company
 Darvel Burgh Corporation
 Denny and Dunipace Burgh Corporation
 Dingwall Burgh Corporation
 Dollar Gas Company
 Doune Burgh Corporation
 Dumbarton Burgh Corporation
 Dumfries Burgh Corporation
 Dunbar Burgh Corporation
 Dunblane Gas Company
 Dundee Corporation (County of the City of Dundee)
 Dunfermline Burgh Corporation
 Dunlop Gas Light Company
 Dunning Gas Company
 Dunoon Burgh Corporation
 Duns Gas Company
 Earlston Gas Company
 East Linton Gas Light Company
 Edinburgh Corporation (County of the City of Edinburgh)
 Elgin Burgh Corporation
 Eyemouth Gas Company
 F. B. Keillor (trading as Comrie Gas Light Company)
 Falkirk Burgh Corporation
 Falkland Gas Undertaker
 Fauldhouse Gas Company
 Forfar Burgh Corporation
 Forres Gas Light Company
 Fraserburgh Burgh Corporation
 Galashiels Gas Company
 Galston Gas Company
 Glasgow Corporation (County of the City of Glasgow)
 Gourock Burgh Corporation
 Grangemouth Burgh Corporation
 Greenock Burgh Corporation
 Haddington Gas Company
 Hamilton Burgh Corporation
 Hawick Gas Company Ltd.
 Helensburgh Burgh Corporation
 Innerleithen Gas Light Company
 Inverbervie Burgh Corporation
 Inverness Burgh Corporation
 Inverurie Gas Company
 Jedburgh Gas Company
 Johnstone Burgh Corporation
 Keith Gas Company
 Kelty Gas Company
 Kettle and District Gas Company
 Kilmarnock Burgh Corporation
 Kilsyth Burgh Corporation
 Kilwinning Gas Company
 Kinghorn Gas-Light Company
 Kinross and Milnathorf Gas Light Company
 Kirkcaldy Burgh Corporation
 Kirkconnel Gas Company
 Kirkcudbright Burgh Corporation
 Kirkintilloch Burgh Corporation
 Kirkwall Burgh Corporation
 Lanark Burgh Corporation
 Lanarkshire County Council
 Largs Burgh Corporation
 Lasswade and Bonnyrigg Gas Light Company
 Laurencekirk Lighting Society Limited
 Leslie Gas Company
 Loanhead Gas Company
 Lochgelly Gas Company
 Lochwinnoch Gas Light Company
 Lockerbie Burgh Corporation
 Melrose Gas Company
 Millport Burgh Corporation
 Moffat Gas Light Company
 Monifieth Burgh Corporation
 Montrose Gas Company
 Motherwell and Wishaw Burgh Corporation
 Muirkirk Gas-Light Company
 Musselburgh Gas Company
 Newburgh Gas Company
 Newmilns and Greenholm Burgh Corporation
 Newport Burgh Corporation
 Newton-on-Ayr Gas Company
 North Berwick Burgh Corporation
 Oban & District Gas Company
 Oldmeldrum Burgh Corporation
 Paisley Burgh Corporation
 Peebles Burgh Corporation
 Penicuik and District Gas Company
 Perth Burgh Corporation
 Peterhead Burgh Corporation
 Pitlochry New Gas Light Company
 Polmont District Gas Company
 Port Glasgow Burgh Corporation
 Renfrew Burgh Corporation
 Rothesay Burgh Corporation
 Sanquhar Burgh Corporation
 Selkirk Gas Company
 St Andrews Gas Company
 Stirling Gas Light Company
 Stornoway Gas Light Company
 Stranraer Gas Company
 Stromness Burgh Corporation
 Tain Burgh Corporation
 Tayport Burgh Corporation
 The Aberfeldy Gas Light Company
 The Annan Gas Company
 The Armadale Gas Company
 The Bathgate Gas Company
 The Biggar Gas Company
 The Brechin Gas Company
 The Buckie Gas Light Company
 The Carluke Gas Company
 The Girvan Gas Company
 The Gorebridge Gas Light Company
 The Huntly Gas Company
 The Inverkeithing Gas Light Company
 The Irvine & District Gas Company
 The Kelso Gas Company
 The Kennoway and Largo Gas Company
 The Kilmacolm Gas Company
 The Kirriemuir Gas Company
 The Langholm Gas and Electricity Supply Company
 The Lerwick Gas Company
 The Lesmahagow Gas Light Company
 The Linlithgow Gas Company
 The Markinch Gas Light Company
 The Maybole Gas Light Company
 The Nairn Gas Light Company
 The Neilston Gas Light Company
 The New Cumnock Gas Company
 The Newton-Stewart Gas Company
 The Prestonpans and District Gas Company
 The Saltcoats Gas Company
 The Skelmorlie and Wemyss Bay Gas and Electric Supply Company
 The Stane and Dykehead Gas Company
 The Stevenston Gas Company
 The Stewarton Gas Company
 The Stonehaven Gas Company
 The Strathaven Gas Company
 The Strathmiglo Gas Company
 The Thurso and North of Scotland Gas Corporation
 The trustees of the late R. G. E. Wemyss
 The Turriff Gas Company
 Tranent Gas Company
 Troon Burgh Corporation
 Vale of Leven Gas Company
 W. & J. Knox Limited
 W. Watson (trading as Lauder Gas Company)
 West Calder Gas Company
 West Kilbride Gas Light Company
 Wick Gas Company
 Wigtown Burgh Corporation

External links
 The Gas (Allocation of Undertakings to Area Boards and Gas Council) Order, 1949 (1949 No. 742)
 Letter from Sir Andrew Clow to senior managers on his retirement 28 April 1956.

1949 establishments in Scotland
1973 disestablishments in Scotland
Government agencies established in 1949
Government agencies disestablished in 1973
Defunct organisations based in Scotland
Former nationalised industries of the United Kingdom
Government of Scotland
Oil and gas companies of Scotland
Utilities of Scotland
Organisations based in Edinburgh
British companies disestablished in 1973
British companies established in 1949